Reinhold Grönvall (1 May 1851, Pori - 3 March 1916) was a Finnish Lutheran clergyman. He was a member of the Parliament of Finland from 1910 until his death in 1916, representing the Finnish Party.

References

1851 births
1916 deaths
People from Pori
People from Turku and Pori Province (Grand Duchy of Finland)
19th-century Finnish Lutheran clergy
Finnish Party politicians
Members of the Parliament of Finland (1910–11)
Members of the Parliament of Finland (1911–13)
Members of the Parliament of Finland (1913–16)
University of Helsinki alumni
20th-century Finnish Lutheran clergy